The Sri Lanka A cricket team is a national cricket team representing Sri Lanka. It is the second-tier of international Sri Lankan cricket, below the full Sri Lanka national cricket team. Matches played by Sri Lanka A are not considered to be Test matches or One Day Internationals, instead receiving first-class and List A classification respectively. Sri Lanka A played their first match in February 1991, a 45-over contest against England A.

Sri Lanka A have played a number of series, both home and away against other national A teams, and competed against other first-class opposition.

Sri Lanka A Cricket team has the world record for the highest 7th wicket partnership in List A history(Rangana Herath & Thilina Kandamby put on 203*)

5 different captains have led the Sri Lanka A side in T20 matches.

Current squad

References

National sports teams of Sri Lanka
Sri Lanka in international cricket
National 'A' cricket teams